Maja Chwalińska and Daria Kuczer were the defending champions, but chose to participate with different partners. Chwalińska played alongside Ulrikke Eikeri, while Kuczer partnered Stefania Rogozińska Dzik. The two teams played in the first round, with Chwalińska and Eikeri winning.

Chwalińska and Eikeri went on to win the title, defeating Weronika Falkowska and Martyna Kubka in the final, 6–4, 6–1.

Seeds

Draw

Draw

References
Main Draw

WSG Open - Doubles
WSG Open